Chersaecia is a genus of air-breathing land snails, terrestrial pulmonate gastropod mollusks in the family Plectopylidae.

Species
Species in the genus Chersaecia include:
 Chersaecia auffenbergi Páll-Gergely, 2018
 Chersaecia austeni (Gude, 1899)
 Chersaecia brachyplecta (Benson, 1863)
 Chersaecia densegyrata Páll-Gergely, 2018
 Chersaecia dextrorsa (Benson, 1860)
 Chersaecia feddeni (W. T. Blanford, 1865)
 Chersaecia goniobathmos (Ehrmann, 1922)
 Chersaecia leiophis (Benson, 1860)
 Chersaecia leucochila (Gude, 1898)
 Chersaecia magna (Gude, 1897)
 Chersaecia mogokensis Páll-Gergely, 2018
 Chersaecia nagaensis (Godwin-Austen, 1875)
 Chersaecia perarcta (W. T. Blanford, 1865)
 Chersaecia perrierae (Gude, 1898)
 Chersaecia refuga (Gould, 1846)
 Chersaecia reversalis Páll-Gergely, 2018
 Chersaecia scabra Páll-Gergely, 2018
 Chersaecia shanensis (Stoliczka, 1873)
 Chersaecia shiroiensis (Godwin-Austen, 1875)
 Chersaecia smithiana (Gude, 1897)
 Chersaecia woodthorpei (Gude, 1899)

References

External links
 Gude G. K. (1899). Armature of helicoid landshells and new sections of Plectopylis. Science-Gossip. 6(65): 147-149
 Páll-Gergely B., Budha P.B., Naggs F., Backeljau T. & Asami T. (2015). Review of the genus Endothyrella Zilch, 1960 with description of five new species (Gastropoda, Pulmonata, Plectopylidae). ZooKeys. 529: 1-70

Plectopylidae
Taxa named by William Henry Benson